Switch is a 2011 French action film directed by Frédéric Schœndœrffer.

Plot 

Sophie Malaterre, an unemployed Canadian graphic designer, spontaneously accepts a chance of a holiday abroad: from an acquaintance, Claire Marras, she learns of a website called "Switch", through which she can temporarily swap her home for someone else’s. Sophie arranges a swap for a Paris apartment owned by a woman called Bénédicte Serteaux.  They exchange their apartment keys by mail and Sophie flies to Paris.

On arrival, Sophie is delighted with her “holiday” apartment, although she notices one room is locked and she has not been provided with the key. However, happy to be in Paris, she enjoys a day sightseeing in the city. She briefly meets a young man called Kourosh, who gives her his phone number so she can call him for a date. Back at the apartment, Sophie prepares a meal with food from the refrigerator, which she eats in the garden within sight of the Eiffel Tower. She takes photos and sends them to Claire with a message.

The next morning Sophie wakes feeling groggy and unwell. She takes a shower to refresh herself, but is alarmed when a police task force storm into the apartment and proceed to search it. In the locked room, a headless corpse is found; the man is Thomas Huygens, the boyfriend of Benedicte Serteaux. Believing Sophie to be Benedicte, the police arrest her.

At the police station, Sophie tries to convince the investigators that she is not Serteaux, but any evidence that would prove her true identity seems to have been destroyed overnight. Sophie explains that she thinks she must have been drugged. In the apartment, investigators find a passport with Sophie’s photo, in the name of Bénédicte Serteaux. All traces of the Switch website, and Sophie’s flight to Paris, have disappeared from the internet. Neighbours identify Sophie’s photo as that of Bénédicte, and so does Bénédicte’s mother. Sophie is in despair. She gives the investigators her Montreal address and begs them to make enquiries there. The lead detective, Forgeat, asks her why, if she is from Montreal, she does not have an accent. Sophie tells him she lived in France with her parents until she was 12.

Sophie is taken for a psychiatric assessment, as Benedicte’s records show that she has a history of mental problems, suicide attempts and criminal behaviour. Sophie asks the police to check her blood group against that of Bénédicte, but it turns out they both have the same rare blood type, which only further convinces the detective that Sophie is in fact Bénédicte. She is about to be temporarily committed to a psychiatric ward, while further investigations are carried out in Montreal, but in despair Sophie begs Forgeat to take her to a dentist, believing this will reveal that work done on her teeth is not of French origin. At the dentist’s office, Sophie grabs a scalpel and holds it to the dentist’s neck. She tells Forgeat to unfasten her handcuffs and handcuff himself to a pipe. Then she grabs his gun, and Benedicte’s file, and makes her escape.

On the run, a desperate Sophie hijacks a car and forces the driver, a young Japanese woman, to hand over her credit card and PIN. She tells the woman that the police have forced her to resort to these measures. She then drives off and eventually dumps the car, and withdraws money from the Japanese woman’s bank account.

Sophie takes the Metro to another area, where she finds a small shop selling a variety of items, including clothes. She buys a change of clothes and a cell phone. The shop owner suspects she is running away from something or someone, but he is sympathetic to her. Then Sophie checks into a small hotel for the night.

Meanwhile, in Montreal, a woman wearing a headscarf and sunglasses arrives on a flight from Paris. She tells the taxi driver to take her to Sophie’s address, stopping only to collect a package from a delivery office. Later, detectives arrive at Sophie’s house to question this woman, but she says she is Sophie Malaterre and they believe her.

Back in Paris, Detective Forgeat interviews renowned sculptor Alice Serteaux, who is Benedicte’s mother. Many of Alice’s sculptures represent the DNA helix. She identifies Sophie as her daughter, from a photo. It becomes clear during the interview that Alice and her daughter were on bad terms, and that she did not love her child. Before leaving, Forgeat surreptitiously takes some hair from Alice’s hairbrush, for DNA.

Holed up in her hotel, Sophie is leafing through the file on Bénédicte Serteaux, looking for something that would link them. She calls her mother Marianne in Montreal and asks her to go to her, Sophie’s, house and try to find something that will prove her identity. Mother and daughter stay in contact by phone during the trip. When Marianne Malaterre arrives at the darkened house Sophie has a change of heart and pleads with her mother to call the police instead of entering on her own. But Marianne is determined to follow through and, taking a loaded shotgun and a flashlight from the trunk of her car, she goes into the house. The lights don’t work, but by the flashlight beam she finds her way to Sophie’s bedroom, where Thomas Huygens’s decapitated head is displayed on the pillow, surrounded by blood and candles, and with slogans daubed in blood on the wall. In a panic, Marianne tries to run, but is felled, and her throat cut, by a woman dressed in black (presumably Bénédicte). Hearing the scuffle on the phone, Sophie is distraught. The mysterious woman then sets fire to the house and leaves.

The next day the manager of Sophie’s hotel recognises her from TV news bulletins and calls the police. Forgeat arrives, with a fellow officer, and sees Sophie in the street. He gives chase, but Sophie is a keen runner in her spare time, and is able to keep ahead of him. After a lengthy chase through gardens and houses, Sophie reaches a busy road, steals a man’s motorbike, and rides off.

By this time, Montreal police have also gone to the house of Claire Marras, and find her lying dead, with her throat cut, in a blood filled bath. It is noted that Claire had paid a large sum of money into her bank account a few days previously.

At the Paris police headquarters, a DNA analysis of the headless corpse has been made. The results are surprising; Thomas and Sophie are half-siblings. Forgeat interviews Thomas's parents and his mother explains that she was artificially inseminated, as her husband is sterile. Similarly, Benedicte’s mother admits that she was also artificially inseminated, as she and her husband were not genetically compatible.

Finding herself once again with nowhere to go, Sophie calls Kourosh, who invites her to stay at his apartment. She tells him the whole story, and he appears sympathetic, but later she hears him on the phone and realises he is in league with Bénédicte. She manages to escape from the apartment, but Kourosh pursues her. During the chase, he falls from a balcony into the street and is killed.

By now, Detective Forgeat has managed to piece everything together. When Sophie’s parents lived in Paris they were desperately hard up, and her father sold his sperm for extra cash. He thus unknowingly became the father of both Thomas and Bénédicte. Bénédicte, under an assumed name, took a job at the laboratory in question and discovered the true facts about her parentage.

Sophie returns to Benedicte’s flat to look for clues, but Bénédicte is there and attacks her. Sophie runs off and calls Forgeat, but she has been followed by Bénédicte, who overpowers her and knocks her out.

When Sophie wakes, she is at the laboratory in chains. Bénédicte tells her that she had the worst childhood imaginable, with a mother who hated her, and when she found out who her biological father’s other children were, she decided to punish them for having been happy when she was not. Bénédicte had cosmetic surgery to look more like Sophie, and she employed Claire Marras, who was a computer expert, to create the Switch website. Claire also deleted the website afterwards, along with Sophie’s flight details. Benedicte is about to kill the hysterical Sophie when Forgeat and his men arrive and shoot Bénédicte dead.

Forgeat comforts the traumatised Sophie, reassuring her that he knows everything and that she is finally safe.

Cast 
 Karine Vanasse as Sophie Malaterre
 Éric Cantona as Damien Forgeat
 Mehdi Nebbou as Stéphane Defer
 Aurélien Recoing as Delors
 Niseema Theillaud as Alice Serteaux
 Karina Testa as Bénédicte Serteaux
 Bruno Todeschini as Verdier
 Stéphane Demers as Inspecteur Lachaux
 Stéphan Guérin-Tillié as Policeman
 Maxim Roy as Claire Marras

Locations
 Paris
 Le Plessis-Robinson
 Montreal

References

External links 
 

2011 action films
2011 films
French action films
Films directed by Frédéric Schoendoerffer
2010s French films